Alexiou is a Greek surname, meaning "son of Alexis". Notable people with the surname include:

Alexandros Alexiou (born 1963), Greek footballer
 Elli Alexiou (189–1988), Greek writer
Giannis Alexiou (born 1984), Greek footballer
Haris Alexiou (born 1950), Greek singer
, British Neohellenist and Byzantinist
Peter Vagenas (born 1978), American soccer player
Sophocles Alexiou (born 1961), British photographer

Greek-language surnames
Patronymic surnames
Surnames from given names